Richmond is a minor suburb of Christchurch, New Zealand.

Situated to the inner north east of the city centre, the suburb is bounded by Shirley Road to the north, Hills Road to the west, and the Avon River to the south and east.

In 2018, ongoing earthquake repairs and flood mitigation work were causing disruption within Richmond.

Demographics

Richmond had a population of 4,311 at the 2018 New Zealand census, unchanged since the 2013 census, and a decrease of 1,095 people (-20.3%) since the 2006 census. There were 1,815 households. There were 2,220 males and 2,085 females, giving a sex ratio of 1.06 males per female, with 618 people (14.3%) aged under 15 years, 1,212 (28.1%) aged 15 to 29, 1,995 (46.3%) aged 30 to 64, and 477 (11.1%) aged 65 or older.

Ethnicities were 75.5% European/Pākehā, 12.8% Māori, 4.0% Pacific peoples, 15.7% Asian, and 3.5% other ethnicities (totals add to more than 100% since people could identify with multiple ethnicities).

The proportion of people born overseas was 27.6%, compared with 27.1% nationally.

Although some people objected to giving their religion, 51.5% had no religion, 30.7% were Christian, 3.4% were Hindu, 1.5% were Muslim, 1.0% were Buddhist and 5.1% had other religions.

Of those at least 15 years old, 909 (24.6%) people had a bachelor or higher degree, and 546 (14.8%) people had no formal qualifications. The employment status of those at least 15 was that 2,019 (54.7%) people were employed full-time, 507 (13.7%) were part-time, and 180 (4.9%) were unemployed.

History

Avebury House is a large two-storeyed building built in 1885 with extensions added in 1907. It is just north of the Avon river and is surrounded by garden like grounds open to the public. Since the 1990s, it has been used as a community facility.

Education
Jean Seabrook Memorial School is a private coeducational primary school for years 1 to 8. It had a roll of  students as of  The school is for students with learning or social difficulties.

References

External links
Local history group

Suburbs of Christchurch